The EMD E8 is a , A1A-A1A passenger-train locomotive built by General Motors' Electro-Motive Division (EMD) of La Grange, Illinois. A total of 450 cab versions, or E8As, were built from August 1949 to January 1954, 447 for the U.S. and 3 for Canada. 46 E8Bs were built from December 1949 to January 1954, all for the U.S. The 2,250 hp came from two 12 cylinder model 567B engines, each driving a generator to power the two traction motors on one truck. The E8 was the ninth model in the line of passenger diesels of similar design known as EMD E-units. Starting in September 1953, a total of 21 E8As were built which used either the 567BC or 567C engines.

In profile the front of the nose of E7, E8, and E9 units is less slanted than earlier EMD units, and E7/8/9s (and their four axle cousins, the F-unit series) have been nicknamed "bulldog nose" units. Earlier E-unit locomotives were nicknamed "slant nose" units. After passenger trains were canceled on the Erie Lackawanna in 1970 (excluding their commuter service, which the Metropolitan Transportation Authority subsidized in 1973), the E8s were re-geared for freight and were very reliable for the EL. These units were on freight trains until the early years of Consolidated Railroad Corporation ("Conrail"). Amtrak used E8s until the late 70s.

Units noted with the designation E8m were rebuilt using components from earlier EMC/EMD locomotives. Externally the units look just like E8s. The difference in horsepower produced in these E8m units is because the older generators are reused.

Original owners

Surviving examples

It is estimated that 58 E8s have survived. The former NYC 4085, preserved at the New York Central Railroad Museum, was the lead locomotive on the final eastbound 20th Century Limited. Another surviving E8 was operated by the Midland Railway, in Baldwin City, Kansas. Privately owned, this unit is ex-Chicago, Rock Island and Pacific Railroad E8A #652 and was used for special events. It and its companion, E6A #630, have been sold to a new museum in Iowa, which will be centered around the Rock Island. New York Central 4097, privately owned, is on display at Merli Manufacturing Company in Duanesburg, New York.

The Monticello Railway Museum owns a former Pennsylvania Railroad E8A. It is currently undergoing restoration, and Monticello plans to paint it up as an Illinois Central E8 to match their collection of former Illinois Central passenger cars.

There are four Southern Railway E8As preserved.  Unit #6900 is operational at the North Carolina Transportation Museum in Spencer, North Carolina, while the railway's #6901 is preserved at the Southeastern Railway Museum in Duluth, Ga, and recently underwent an operational restoration by Norfolk Southern.  These engines have pulled the Southern Crescent and both bear this train's distinct logo. A Southern Railway E8, #6913, is being restored at the Southern Appalachia Railway Museum in Oak Ridge, TN for their Southern excursion train. Yet another, Southern #6914, is nearing the completion of a nearly two decade long restoration at the Tennessee Valley Railroad Museum, having been unveiled at the railroad's 2018 "Railfest", resplendent in green and gold complete with "NO&NE" sublettering.

The St Louis, Iron Mountain, & Southern Railway owns former Pennsylvania Railroad E8A #5898. It was previously owned by the Blue Mountain & Reading. It is the main engine used on their tourist train, and it was repainted in 2015.

Union Pacific E8AM #942 is owned by the Southern California Railway Museum, and is occasionally used on their tourist train, usually pulling the museum's small collection of former Union Pacific passenger cars. It carries the designation E8AM from its time in Chicago-area commuter service. After its time on the Union Pacific, #942 was sold to the Chicago and Northwestern, which used it in commuter service. After serving with CNW, the 942 moved on to serve Chicago's RTA. Upon retirement, it was donated to the museum, and subsequently restored to UP colors in 2012. It was rebuilt with a HEP generator which is what gives it the designation E8AM. However, unlike many E units rebuilt for commuter service, it retained its twin EMD 12-567B prime movers.

Baltimore & Ohio E8A #92 is on static display at the B&O Railroad Museum in Baltimore, Maryland.

Of the units owned by Conrail, three were saved after their freight-service retirement and went on to be refurbished by the Juniata Locomotive Shops in Altoona, PA for use as Conrail's Office Car Special (OCS) until the merger of 1999. One unit went to CSX, and two were sold off to Bennett Levin, CEO of the Juniata Terminal Company, where they have been overhauled and painted as twin Pennsylvania Railroad E8's. As of 2019, these units are not in operation due to a decision by the owner not to retrofit them with positive train control (PTC). 

Another, the former EL 833, was purchased by the New York and Greenwood Lake Railroad. The unit was repainted in its original livery as Erie 833, and was on display for a while on the turntable at Port Jervis, NY. Erie Railroad's E8A No. 833 is stored at Port Jervis station, in Port Jervis, New York, and had occasionally run on excursion trains.

In June 2008, two authentic New York Central E8 units (4080 & 4068) were brought to the Medina Railroad Museum in Western New York.

See also 

List of GM-EMD locomotives

References

Notes

Bibliography

 
 
 Marre, Louis A. (1982). Rock Island Diesel Locomotives - 1930-1980. Railfax, Inc. .
 
 
 Reich, Sy (1973). Diesel Locomotive Rosters – The Railroad Magazine Series. Wayner Publications. No Library of Congress or ISBN.
 
 
 
 
 
 
 
 EMD Product Reference Data Card dated January 1, 1959 has the 567BC and 567C engine data used in the as-built roster.

External links

 
 Midland Railway roster
 Andrew Toppan's list
 CPR Diesel Locomotive Roster

A1A-A1A locomotives
Diesel-electric locomotives of the United States
E8
Locomotives with cabless variants
Passenger locomotives
Railway locomotives introduced in 1949
Standard gauge locomotives of Canada
Standard gauge locomotives of the United States
Diesel-electric locomotives of Canada
Streamlined diesel locomotives